Tyrone Pau (birth unknown) is a former professional rugby league who played in the 2000s.

Playing career
Pau played for the Hibiscus Coast Raiders in 2001 and 2002, being selected in 2001 for Auckland, and in 2002, and 2003 for New Zealand Residents.

Pau then spent five years in France, playing for the Limoux Grizzlies. In 2006 Pau signed with the Leigh Centurions.

Representative career
Tyrone Pau won caps for Cook Islands in the 2000 Rugby League World Cup.

References

External links
Wales v Cook Islands preview
Limouxin 19-18 Halifax

Living people
Auckland rugby league team players
AS Carcassonne players
Cook Islands national rugby league team players
Hibiscus Coast Raiders players
Leigh Leopards players
Limoux Grizzlies players
New Zealand rugby league players
Expatriate sportspeople in England
Place of birth missing (living people)
Rugby league centres
Rugby league second-rows
Rugby league props
Villegailhenc Aragon XIII players
Year of birth missing (living people)